Raddusch station is a railway station in the Raddusch district in the municipality of Vetschau, located in the Oberspreewald-Lausitz district in Brandenburg, Germany.

References

Railway stations in Brandenburg
Buildings and structures in Oberspreewald-Lausitz